Noblesville is a city in and the county seat of Hamilton County, Indiana, United States, a part of the north Indianapolis suburbs along the White River. The population was 51,969 at the 2010 census making it the state's 14th largest city/town, up from 19th in 2007. As of 2019 the estimated population was 64,668. The city is part of Delaware, Fall Creek, Noblesville, and Wayne townships.

Noblesville is home to the Ruoff Music Center, an outdoor music venue.

History

Noblesville's history dates to 1818 when the government purchased the land which is now Hamilton County from the Native Americans in this area. William Conner, the only settler living in the area at the time, and his wife Mekinges Conner, a Lenape woman, established the first trading post in central Indiana in 1802 and lived in the area's first log cabin. William Conner and Josiah Polk laid out what is now downtown Noblesville in 1823, which was designated as the Hamilton County seat in 1824 and incorporated in 1851. Conner's 1823 home is now one of a village of historic buildings that make up Conner Prairie Pioneer Settlement, a living history museum south of Noblesville in Fishers.

Noblesville was named either for James Noble, one of the first two U.S. senators from Indiana, or, according to legend, for Lavina Noble of Indianapolis, to whom Josiah Polk was engaged.

The Peru and Indianapolis Railroad was completed through town in 1851, strengthening the town economically and causing the population to increase. In 1875 work began on the town's second railroad, the Anderson, Lebanon and St. Louis, later known as the Midland.
 
The city's first large growth period occurred during the Indiana gas boom, with the discovery in 1888 of Noblesville's first natural gas well near 11th and Pleasant streets. Many Victorian homes, as well as most of the downtown commercial district, were built during this time of prosperity. The city has undergone another increase recently as its population grew from 28,590 in 2000 to 51,969 in 2010. This growth echoes the increase in population of much of southern Hamilton County due to its proximity to Indianapolis.

Noblesville was once noted for its flour mills, the mostly widely known of which was the Noblesville Milling Company, producer of Diadem and Kismet flours. In 1925, the manager of the company offered to buy uniforms for the local high school athletic team in exchange for the school adopting the nickname "Millers". The nickname persists to this day.

Other prominent businesses included the Union Sanitary Manufacturing Company, the American Strawboard Company and Firestone Industrial Products.

Among the notable disasters that have struck the town are the Great Flood of 1913, an interurban wreck on the courthouse square in 1919, and the Goeke fire of 1967. The fire, which began at the Paul Goeke auto dealership just off the square, destroyed two buildings and killed a firefighter'.

The old Hamilton County Sheriff's Residence and Jail on the southwest corner of the courthouse square in downtown Noblesville is now the home of the Hamilton County Museum of History. As a working jail, it once housed Charles Manson as a teenager and D. C. Stephenson, former Grand Dragon of the Indiana Ku Klux Klan. The Stephenson trial, which took place in the adjoining Hamilton County courthouse in 1925, broke the power of the Klan in Indiana and drew national attention to Noblesville. Stephenson was convicted of second-degree murder in the death of Madge Oberholtzer.

During the early 1920s, Noblesville was one of several Indiana towns where the Ku Klux Klan was active, but the Klan's influence quickly faded after Stephenson's conviction. In 1973 Klansmen staging a march in Noblesville were met by counter-demonstrators carrying anti-Klan placards.

In 1995, a local contractor stumbled across a trunk containing Klan paraphernalia and membership records from the 1920s. The debate over how to handle the sensitive issue again put Noblesville in the national spotlight. The Hamilton County Historical Society, which received donated materials, opted to keep the public from seeing the former members' names.

Noblesville also attracted national media attention in 1965 when Noblesville Daily Ledger editor James T. Neal was charged with contempt by Hamilton County Circuit Court judge Ed New. Neal's fight for the First Amendment went before the Indiana Supreme Court. In May 2018, it drew national attention again as the Noblesville West Middle School was the site of a school shooting with a teacher and student injured.

List of mayors

Architecture

The centerpiece of downtown Noblesville is the Courthouse Square, the location of the Hamilton County Courthouse (completed in 1879) and the Hamilton County Sheriff's Residence and Jail (constructed in 1876). Both buildings are fabulous examples of the Second Empire style featuring mansard roofs. Sites and buildings in Noblesville that are listed on the National Register of Historic Places include the Hamilton County Courthouse Square, the Catherine Street Historic District, Cole-Evans House, Conner Street Historic District, William Houston Craig House, Daniel Craycraft House, Dr. Samuel Harrell House, Holliday Hydroelectric Powerhouse and Dam, Nickel Plate Road Steam Locomotive No. 587, Noblesville Commercial Historic District, Noblesville Milling Company Mill, South 9th Street Historic District, Judge Earl S. Stone House, and Robert L. Wilson House.

Geography
Noblesville is located in central Hamilton County at  (40.049935, −86.021462). It is bordered to the north by Cicero, to the south by Fishers and Carmel, and to the west by Westfield. A narrow portion of Noblesville extends east to the Madison County line, where it is bordered by the town of Ingalls.

Indiana State Road 37 is the main highway through the city, running east of downtown. It leads south to Interstate 69 in Fishers and thence to Indianapolis, and northeast  to Marion. Conner Street, carrying state routes 32 and 38, is the main east–west road through the center of Noblesville. SR 32 leads east-northeast  to Anderson and west  to Westfield, while SR 38 leads east-southeast  to Pendleton and northwest  to Sheridan. Indiana State Road 19 runs north from Noblesville, leading  to Tipton.

Demographics

As of 2000, the median income for a household in the city was $73,395, and the median per capita income was $33,732. Approximately 45.22% of the population has a higher education degree with over 87.3% of the population at least having a high school diploma or GED. The median housing value is $171,272 with a total of 17,915 housing units.

2010 census
As of the census of 2010, there were 51,969 people, 19,080 households, and 13,989 families residing in the city. The racial makeup of the city was 91.1% White, 3.6% African American, 0.2% Native American, 1.7% Asian, 0.1% Pacific Islander, 1.6% from other races, and 1.8% from two or more races. Hispanic or Latino of any race were 4.3% of the population.

There were 19,080 households, of which 42.9% had children under the age of 18 living with them, 58.3% were married couples living together, 10.8% had a female householder with no husband present, 4.2% had a male householder with no wife present, and 26.7% were non-families. 21.6% of all households were made up of individuals, and 6% had someone living alone who was 65 years of age or older. The average household size was 2.69 and the average family size was 3.15.

The median age in the city was 33 years. 30.2% of residents were under the age of 18; 6.5% were between the ages of 18 and 24; 33% were from 25 to 44; 21.6% were from 45 to 64; and 8.7% were 65 years of age or older. The gender makeup of the city was 48.4% male and 51.6% female.

Arts and culture
There are many recreational amenities in Noblesville, including seven public and private golf courses, the Belfry Theater, Downtown Noblesville shopping and historic sightseeing, the extensive public park system including Forest Park and Dr. James A. Dillon Park, the Hamilton County Artists' Association] and its Birdie Gallery, Hamilton Town Center, Morse Park and Beach, Ruoff Home Mortgage Music Center, and the White River Canoe Company.

Education
Most of Noblesville is in the Noblesville Schools school district, while a portion is in Hamilton Southeastern Schools. Noblesville High School is the comprehensive high school of the former district. In the latter school district portions of Noblesville are served by two different comprehensive high schools: Fishers High School and Hamilton Southeastern High School. Noblesville is also home to St. Theodore Guerin High School.

Sister cities
Noblesville has two sister cities as designated by Sister Cities International.

 Cittadella, Veneto, Italy
 Nova Prata, Rio Grande do Sul, Brazil

Notable people
 Lillian Albertson, actress and theatrical producer
 Tracy Anderson, author and multi-platform fitness/wellness entrepreneur
 Drew Powell, actor
 Scott Baldwin, businessman and politician
 David Boudia, Olympic diver and gold medalist, 10-meter platform, 2012 London Olympics
 Bryan Clauson, IndyCar, NASCAR, and USAC driver
 Kelly Crull, sports anchor and reporter for Fox Sports South
 Derek Daly, former Formula 1 and CART driver, currently a pundit on Speed TV
 Conor Daly, son of Derek Daly, IndyCar, and NASCAR driver
 Ralph W. Gwinn, 20th-century US congressman
 Scott Haffner, former NBA basketball player with the Charlotte Hornets and Miami Heat
 Clinton L. Hare, football head coach at Butler University and Purdue
 Timothy Kraft, retired political consultant; campaign manager in 1980 for U.S. President Jimmy Carter
 Norman Norell, fashion designer
 William Dudley Pelley, leader of Christian Party and fascist Silver Legion
 Ashley Prange, professional golfer and winner of The Big Break
 Roger Stern, Superman comic book writer: Death of Superman
 Rex Stout, creator of popular Nero Wolfe detective series; born in Noblesville, family moved away shortly thereafter
 Victoria Spartz, member of the U.S. House of Representatives
 Michael Sylvester, opera singer
 Steve Wariner, country music singer and songwriter
 Wes Whisler, former Major League Baseball pitcher
 Chris Hacker, NASCAR driver

Education
Most Noblesville students attend Noblesville Schools, while some attend Hamilton Southeastern Schools:

 Noblesville High School [9–12]
 St. Theodore Guerin High School [9–12] (private)
 Noblesville East Middle School [6–8]
 Noblesville West Middle School [6–8]
 Hazel Dell Elementary [K-5]
 Hinkle Creek Elementary [K-5]
 Noble Crossing Elementary [K-5]
 North Elementary [K-5]
 Promise Road Elementary [K-5]
 Stony Creek Elementary [K-5]
 White River Elementary [K-5]
 Our Lady of Grace School [K-8] (private)
 Legacy Christian School [K-12] (private)
 Options High School [9-12] (Private)

The city has a lending library, the Hamilton East Public Library.

References

External links

 City of Noblesville official website
 Noblesville Chamber of Commerce

 
Cities in Indiana
Cities in Hamilton County, Indiana
County seats in Indiana
Indianapolis metropolitan area
Populated places established in 1823
1823 establishments in Indiana